Ravil Tagir (born 6 May 2003) is a professional footballer who plays as a defender for Belgian club Westerlo on loan from Süper Lig club İstanbul Başakşehir. Born in Kazakhstan, Tagir is a youth international for Turkey.

Early Years
Tagir was born on 6 May 2003, in Taraz, Jambyl Region, Kazakhstan. His father, Gülali Tagir emigrated to Bursa in 2002, after his sister got married there. Tagir's Grand parents were Meskhetian Turks who were exiled to Kazakhstan during the Soviet Union in 1944.

Club career
Following a tryout event held in city of Bursa, Tagir, at the age of 12, was drafted by İzmir-based Altınordu F.K. in 2015, where he spent five years. On 29 June 2019, Altınordu announced that Tagir signed his first professional contract with them. He made his TFF First League debut against Hatayspor on 18 August 2019, in which Altınordu lost 1–0. On 14 February 2020, he scored his first goal at professional level against Osmanlıspor FK, ended 2–2.

İstanbul Başakşehir F.K. announced the transfer of Tagir, for an agreed €2.5m transfer fee, with an 30% future sales commission for Altınordu FK. on 28 September 2020. Parties agreed on a three-season-long contract.

Tagir made his Süper Lig debut against Denizlispor on week 10 encounter of Lig 2020–21 season, ended 3–3, at Başakşehir Fatih Terim Stadium, on 28 November 2020. He scored his first goal at Başakşehir against Tuzlaspor, scoring fourth goal of team with an header in the 79th minute of a Round 16 away encounter of 2020–21 Turkish Cup, ended 5–1 for Başakşehir on 13 January 2021. Tagir was included in match squad at 2020 Turkish Super Cup Final, however; he stayed as an unused player st bench against Trabzonspor, played on 27 January 2021 at a delayed fixture due to COVID-19 pandemic which Başakşehir lost 2–1.

On 23 June 2022, Tagir moved to Westerlo in Belgium on a two-season loan.

International career
Due to his background, he is eligible to represent for Turkey, Georgia and Kazakhstan at senior level.

Tagir represented Turkey first at U-15 level, when he was invited by coach Nedim Yiğit, along with three other teammates from Altınordu, for two friendly games to be held against Romania U-15 national team, in March 2018. He earned his first cap at youth international levels in a friendly game against Romania on 6 March 2018, ended 3–0 for Turkey.

Tagir played his first U-16 game against Scotland on 22 August 2018, in which he scored the opening goal as game ended 2–0 for Turkey, at St. George Park Tournament.

Tagir was invited to Turkey U-21 team for first time by coach Vedat İnceefe, for the qualification stage game of 2021 UEFA European Under-21 Championship, against England U-21 on 30 August 2019. He earned his first U-21 cap, as a starter, at 2021 UEFA U-21 Championship qualification stage - Group 3 encounter, against England U-21, which Turkey lost 3–2.

Tagir was called up to the senior Turkey squad for the 2022–23 UEFA Nations League matches against Luxembourg on 22 September 2022 and Faroe Islands on 25 September 2022.

Career statistics

Club

References

External links
 Ravil Tagir at TFF

Living people
2003 births
Citizens of Turkey through descent
Meskhetian Turkish people
People from Jambyl Region
Turkish footballers
Association football defenders
Turkey youth international footballers
Turkey under-21 international footballers
Kazakhstani footballers
Kazakhstani people of Turkish descent
Kazakhstani people of Georgian descent
Kazakhstani emigrants to Turkey
Turkish people of Kazakhstani descent
Turkish people of Georgian descent
Süper Lig players
TFF First League players
Altınordu F.K. players
İstanbul Başakşehir F.K. players
K.V.C. Westerlo players
Turkish expatriate footballers
Expatriate footballers in Belgium
Turkish expatriate sportspeople in Belgium